Synemon gratiosa, the graceful sun-moth, is a moth in the Castniidae family. It is found in Western Australia, from Namburg National Park in the north to Mandurah in the south.

The wingspan is 25–35 mm. The upper surface of the forewings is dark grey-black with obscure light grey markings, while the upper surface of the hindwings and the undersides of both wings are bright orange with some darker grey-black bands.

Adults are on wing in autumn. There is one generation per year.

The larvae feed on Lomandra maritima and Lomandra hermaphrodita. They tunnel within the roots or rhizomes of the host plant. They are white and hairless.

References

Moths described in 1877
Castniidae